Trends in Cell Biology is a peer-reviewed scientific journal by Elsevier BV.

Abstracting and indexing 
Trends in Cell Biology is abstracted and indexed the following bibliographic databases:
Science Citation Index Expanded
Scopus

According to the Journal Citation Reports, the journal has a 2020 impact factor of 20.808.

References

External links 
 

English-language journals
Elsevier academic journals